André Vasco (born September 8, 1984) is a Brazilian actor and television presenter. He is best known as the host of Qual é o Seu Talento?, the Brazilian version of the Got Talent series.

Biography
André was born on September 8, 1984, in Guarulhos, São Paulo, Brazil. Vasco began played violin in a youth orchestra at age 15, performing in various theaters of São Paulo, including numerous times at the Theatro Municipal.

Career

 2004 - Release Cronojoblife (MTV)
 2005 - The Nadas (MTV)
 2006 - Chapa Coco (MTV)
 2006 - Tribunal de Pequenas Causas Musicais (MTV)
 2006 - Aquecimento VMB 2006
 2007 - Casal Neura (MTV)
 2007 - Chá das Minas  (MTV)
 2007 - Site Virgula Site oficial
 2007 - Viva a Noite (SBT)
 2008 - Band Verão  (Band)
 2008 - Prive 89  (89 FM)
 2009-Presente - Qual é o Seu Talento? (SBT)
 2009 - Teleton (SBT)
 2010 - Teleton (SBT)

References

External links 

André Vasco Official website

1984 births
Living people
People from Guarulhos
Brazilian male television actors